The following is a list of people executed by the U.S. state of Utah.

People executed in Utah

Notes

See also
 Capital punishment in Utah
 Capital punishment in the United States

References

Executions
Utah